Antimony oxide may refer to any of the following:

Diantimony tetroxide, Sb2O4
Antimony trioxide, Sb2O3
Antimony pentoxide, Sb2O5
Antimony hexitatridecoxide, Sb6O13
Stibiconite, Sb3O6(OH)